Wolf Trap Light is a caisson lighthouse in the Virginia portion of the Chesapeake Bay, about seven and a half miles northeast of New Point Comfort Light. It is listed on the National Register of Historic Places.

History
Wolf Trap Shoal juts into the bay from Winter Harbor, a point a few miles north of Mobjack Bay and the York River. It got its name from the 1691 grounding of HMS Wolf, a British naval vessel engaged in enforcing the Navigation Act and in combating piracy. In 1821 a lightship was stationed at this spot, and after refurbishment in 1854, the original ship was destroyed by Confederate raiders in 1861 during the Civil War. Two years later a replacement ship was put on station.

In 1870 a screwpile lighthouse was constructed on a hexagonal foundation, the house being prefabricated at the station at Lazzaretto Point in Baltimore. This light survived until 1893, when ice tore the house from its foundation. The keeper was able to escape, but the house was found floating far to the south at Thimble Shoals, where the lantern and lens were recovered.

A lighthouse tender was put on station to serve as a temporary lightship and a request was put to Congress to appropriate funds for a caisson structure. LV-46, assigned to tend the station, suffered a boiler casualty August 28, 1893, killing two of the crew, and was replaced by LV-97 until March 16, 1894 when LV-46 could return to the station.

Construction began and was completed during 1894; a wooden caisson was used, topped by a cylinder of cast iron plates. The house itself was built of brick, painted red in the late 1920s, standing two stories with the lantern on its roof. Unlike the Maryland examples, the roof is flat. Quantities of rip-rap were dumped around the base of the light to resist pressure from the ice.

Complaints about the visibility of the original fixed light led to a change to a flashing characteristic in 1895. Automation came in 1971. A 300mm acrylic lens was installed in 1984, to be replaced with the current VRB-25 in 1996. A set of black plywood blinds is installed in the lantern to block stray reflections from the panes.

Wolf Trap Light was offered to non-profit and historical organizations in 2004 under the National Historic Lighthouse Preservation Act. As no applications were received, it was put up for auction in 2005. Nick Korstad, of Seattle, Washington, purchased the station, and was unable to obtain financing for his plan to convert the light into a bed and breakfast, and after an unsuccessful attempt to auction the light on eBay, it was sold privately again. The light was bought by Dr. James Southard, Jr. for $119,000, and was again up for sale in 2012, including a nearby waterfront lot, for $288,000.

References

External links 

Chesapeake Bay Lighthouse Project - Wolf Trap Light

Lighthouses completed in 1870
Lighthouses completed in 1894
Houses completed in 1894
Buildings and structures in Mathews County, Virginia
Lighthouses on the National Register of Historic Places in Virginia
National Register of Historic Places in Mathews County, Virginia